Petrowski is a surname. Notable people with the surname include:

Jamie Petrowski (born 1982), American football player
Jerry Petrowski (born 1950), American politician
Joseph Petrowski, American businessman
Nathalie Petrowski (born 1954), French-born Canadian journalist and writer